These are the squads for the UEFA Euro 1996 tournament, which took place in England between 8 June and 30 June 1996. The players' listed ages are as of the tournament's opening day (8 June 1996).

Group A

England
Coach: Terry Venables

Terry Venables announced England's 22-man squad on 28 May 1996.

Netherlands
Coach: Guus Hiddink

Scotland
Coach: Craig Brown

Switzerland
Coach:  Artur Jorge

Group B

Bulgaria
Coach: Dimitar Penev

France
Coach: Aimé Jacquet

Romania
Coach: Anghel Iordănescu

Spain
Coach: Javier Clemente

Group C

Czech Republic
Coach: Dušan Uhrin

Germany
Coach: Berti Vogts

Germany were allowed to call up an additional player, Jens Todt, prior to the final, due to injury problems.

Italy
Coach: Arrigo Sacchi

Russia
Coach: Oleg Romantsev

Caps include those for USSR, CIS, and Russia, while those for other countries, such as Ukraine, are not counted.

Group D

Croatia
Coach: Miroslav Blažević

Denmark
Coach: Richard Møller Nielsen

Portugal
Coach: António Oliveira

Turkey
Coach: Fatih Terim

References

External links
RSSSF
weltfussball.de 

1996
Squads